Ten star or similar may refer to:

Ten-star household, a status awarded to households in rural China
Ten Star Generals, a 1952 story about the Disney fictional organization: Junior Woodchucks